Santosh Jedhe is an Indian former cricketer and current head coach of Maharashtra cricket team. He has represented Maharashtra in 79 first-class matches between 1989 and 1998. Jedhe, an allrounder, played an important role in Maharashtra's 1992–93 Ranji Trophy season by scoring 867 runs and claiming 37 wickets, he was the leading run scorer of 1992 Ranji trophy. He was the highest run score of 1992-1993 Ranji trophy season. He was a prolific batsman. In Ranji trophy his batting average was 50.02.

Career
 
Jedhe scored most runs in 1992 Ranji trophy. He played important knock in Maharashtras' victory in quarterfinal against Tamil Nadu at Bhusawal. He scored 168 runs in first inning and took 5 wickets in inning the winning cause. Maharashtra emerged as second runner up in the final.

References

External links
 

1966 births
Living people
Maharashtra cricketers
West Zone cricketers
Cricketers from Maharashtra
Sportspeople from Pune